"Don't Stop..." is a song by the English rock band Oasis. Released as a single on 30 April 2020, it was the first track to be released from the band in over 11 years since their 2009 single "Falling Down". Written and sung by Noel Gallagher, the song is a lo-fi acoustic demo of an unreleased song believed to have been originally recorded in the mid-2000s. The song is undated, but the music journalist Alexis Petridis speculates it was intended for release on either the Don't Believe the Truth or Dig Out Your Soul albums, recorded with Oasis.

Background
Until its release, the song was only known from its presence on a rough soundcheck tape recorded before a performance in Hong Kong "about 15 years ago", tweeted Gallagher the day before its release. He stated that he had found the song on a seemingly-blank CD as a result of the lockdown related to the COVID-19 pandemic in the United Kingdom, which drove him to look through old material. Due to Gallagher stating that he thought the song was "lost forever", it appears to have been the only existing copy of the song.

Release and reception
The BBC's Mark Savage described the song as "a laid-back, acoustic ballad... sharing its DNA with classic Oasis songs" as "Stop Crying Your Heart Out" and "Don't Look Back in Anger". The Guardian also reacted positively to the song, called it "one of Noel Gallagher’s best latter-day efforts". 

In response to the announcement, Gallagher's ex-Oasis bandmate and younger brother, Liam, tweeted, "Oi tofu boy if your [sic] gonna release old demos make sure im [sic] singing on it and boneheads [sic] playing guitar on it if not it's not worth a wank as you were LG x". Liam also accused Noel of overdubbing the raw recording in a recording studio, calling it a "PR stunt", although The Independent suggested that Liam had claimed to have been "disappointed" at not featuring on the single. Despite this, he later stated that he thought the song was "not a bad tune".

Charts

References

2020 songs
Oasis (band) songs
Songs written by Noel Gallagher
Songs about the COVID-19 pandemic